This is a list of listed buildings in West Dunbartonshire. The list is split out by parish.

 List of listed buildings in Bonhill, West Dunbartonshire
 List of listed buildings in Cardross, West Dunbartonshire
 List of listed buildings in Clydebank, West Dunbartonshire
 List of listed buildings in Dumbarton, West Dunbartonshire
 List of listed buildings in Kilmaronock, West Dunbartonshire
 List of listed buildings in Old Kilpatrick, West Dunbartonshire

See also
 List of Category A listed buildings in West Dunbartonshire

West Dunbartonshire